"Dors, mon amour" ("Sleep, My Love") is a love song written in French by Hubert Giraud, composed by Pierre Delanoë and performed in 1958 by André Claveau as France's entry and the winner of the pan-European Eurovision Song Contest, gaining other versions and minor commercial success.

Described as a romantic "lullaby", the song won the 1958 edition of the Eurovision Song Contest where it beat the runner-up by a small margin, and gained several cover versions including by other Eurovision entrants, with the original version gaining music chart achievement in Belgium and featured in another commercially successful album.

Composition
"Dors, mon amour" is a love song, expressed by the singer telling his lover to sleep, while he muses on their love and the power of the night. It is reviewed as "a classical sort of lullaby", and is compared to newer editions entries songs as "hardly indicative of the camp and bombast which would later come to define Eurovision."

The song was also covered in French in 1958, by 1957 Eurovision winner Corry Brokken, Achille Togliani and Germana Caroli. It is covered in German by Camillo und die Bernd Hansen-Sänger as "Unser Glück, mon amour" and in Swedish by 1958 Eurovision entrant Alice Babs as "Sov min älskling".

Eurovision Song Contest
"Dors, mon amour" won the 1958 edition of the annual Eurovision Song Contest, where it was performed third in a field of ten, following the ' entry "Heel de wereld" and preceding 's "Un grand amour". By the close of voting, it had received 27 points, placing it first, with three points above Switzerland. This is the first winning entry sung by a male leading vocalist, following the 1956 and 1957 editions.

Charts
"Dors, mon amour" is marked as a numberless "peak"-note position on Belgium's Walloon region single music chart for the week of 1 June 1958, and is included in the 2005 compilation "50 Years Of The Eurovision Song Contest 1956 - 1980" which charted in Switzerland.

References

External links
 Eurovision World page for 1958
 Detailed info & lyrics, The Diggiloo Thrush, "Dors, mon amour".

Songs about sleep
Eurovision songs of France
Eurovision songs of 1958
French-language songs
Eurovision Song Contest winning songs
Songs written by Hubert Giraud
Songs written by Pierre Delanoë
1958 songs